Cesar Augusto Pereira Marques, better known as Cesinha (born October 8, 1986 in São José dos Campos), is a Brazilian footballer who plays as a centre back for Taubaté.

Career
It was revealed in the categories of basic team from Grande ABC, later being used as a starter on defense after the club.

After participation in beautiful Paulistão by Santo André, where he was runners-up in 2010, Cesinha moved to Vasco da Gama. Cesinha won the 2011 Copa do Brasil with Vasco. He retired from playing professional football in October 2016.

Career statistics
(Correct )

References

External links
Profile at Soccerway
 ogol.com.br

1986 births
Living people
Brazilian footballers
Esporte Clube Santo André players
CR Vasco da Gama players
Clube Náutico Capibaribe players
Association football central defenders
People from São José dos Campos
Footballers from São Paulo (state)